The 2015 World Junior Ice Hockey Championship Division III tournament was played in Dunedin, New Zealand, from 20 to 25 January 2015. Division III represents the sixth tier of the World Junior Ice Hockey Championships. The winners, China, were promoted to the Division II B for the 2016 tournament.

Bulgaria withdrew from the tournament on December 27, 2014.

Participants

Final standings

Results
All times are local (New Zealand Daylight Time – UTC+13).

References

External links
IIHF.com
New Zealand Ice Hockey Federation site

III
World Junior Ice Hockey Championships – Division III
International ice hockey competitions hosted by New Zealand
Sports competitions in Dunedin
January 2015 sports events in New Zealand
2010s in Dunedin